SS Cuba Victory was built and operated as Victory ship class cargo ship which operated as a cargo carrier in World War II, Korean War and Vietnam War.

Construction
Cuba Victory was laid down under U.S. Maritime Commission contract by Permanente Metals Corporation, Richmond, California on 31 March 1944, under the Emergency Shipbuilding program. She was launched on 27 June 1944 and was delivered to the War Shipping Administration (WSA) on 19 August 1944.

The SS Cuba Victory was used near the end of World War II. The ship's United States Maritime Commission designation was VC2-S-AP3, hull number P No. 1 (530), Victory #530. The Maritime Commission turned her over to a civilian contractor for operation. Victory ships were designed to replace the earlier Liberty Ships. Liberty ships were designed to be used just for WW2. Victory ships were designed to last longer and serve the US Navy after the war. The Victory ship differed from a Liberty ship in that they were: faster, longer and wider, taller, with a thinner stack set farther toward the superstructure and had a long raised forecastle.

World War II
During World War II Cuba Victory operated as a merchantman and was chartered to the Mississippi Shipping Company. With a civilian crew and United States Navy Armed Guard to man the ship guns. SS Cuba Victory served in the Pacific Ocean in World War II as part of the Pacific war. SS Cuba Victory Naval Armed Guard crews earned "Battle Stars" in World War II for the assault occupation of Okinawa. Cuba Victory used its guns to defend herself and other ships at Okinawa. Three Victory ships at Okinawa sank: SS Canada Victory, SS Logan Victory and SS Hobbs Victory. Cuba Victory and other ships were attached April 27, 1945 in the Battle of Okinawa. On 12 May 1945 at night in fog on her way back home, the Cuba Victory, about a 100 miles from the remote US Navy base at Ulithi, collided with the ammunition ship SS Saginaw Victory.  The damage to both ships was substantial. The two ships went to the Truk Island (now called Chuuk Lagoon) to have the damages checked. An escort ship took the two ships back to Ulithi. The Cuba Victory was repaired and put back into service.

Post World War II
Many wanting to escape the war damaged Europe and find new opportunities to work traveled to Argentina after World War II. The Cuba Victory made two trips from Europe to the Port of Buenos Aires, Argentina. Cuba Victory docked at the port on 29 August 1946 and again on 4 January 1947 with new immigrants. After the war in 1948 the Cuba Victory was laid up at Beaumont, Texas in the reserve fleet there.

Korean War
For the Korean War the Cuba Victory was removed from the reserve fleet and put back in service. She was operated by the Moore-McCormack cargo line. SS Cuba Victory served as merchant marine naval ship supplying goods for the Korean War. About 75 percent of the personnel taken to Korea for the Korean War came by the merchant marine ships. The SS Cuba Victory transported goods, mail, food and other supplies. About 90 percent of the cargo was moved by merchant marine naval to the Korean war zone. SS Cuba Victory made trips between 1950 and 1952 helping American forces engaged against Communist aggression in South Korea. After the war she was returned to the reserve fleet.

Vietnam War
In 1966 the Cuba Victory was reactivated for the Vietnam War. On 24 May 1868 while unloading  ammunition at Cat Lai in upper part of the Saigon River in the Nhà Bè District, she was hit by a Viet Cong artillery shell and suffered significant damage. The attack killed three dockworkers and two tugboat crew. The USS Mataco (AT-86) a Navajo-class fleet tug towed her down the river. Cuba Victory returned to Beaumont reserve fleet. In The 1985 Cuba Victory was scrapped in Brownsville, Texas.

See also
List of Victory ships
 Liberty ship
 Type C1 ship
 Type C2 ship
 Type C3 ship

References

Sources
Sawyer, L.A. and W.H. Mitchell. Victory ships and tankers: The history of the ‘Victory’ type cargo ships and of the tankers built in the United States of America during World War II, Cornell Maritime Press, 1974, 0-87033-182-5.
United States Maritime Commission: 
Victory Cargo Ships 

Ships built in Richmond, California
1944 ships
World War II merchant ships of the United States
Victory ships